MFK CSKA Moskva is a Russian futsal club based in Moscow, part of multi-sport club CSKA Moscow. The club was founded in 1996 under the name Bolear-MGAFK. In 1997, the team was renamed to CSKA-Bolear. The following season, they qualified to the top division of the Russian championship (currently known as Super League). After that, the club was renamed to CSKA. The team's best result: 5th place in the 2007-08 and 2009-10 seasons, as well as 1/4 finals in four cases when the championships was held with the play-off system.

In 2012, the club lost its professional status, and since then has been participating in the Moscow Championship.

References

External links
MFK CSKA news
MFK CSKA profile at Moscow Football Federation site

CSKA Moscow
CSKA Moskva
Futsal clubs established in 1996
1996 establishments in Russia